Cerithiella eulimella is a species of very small sea snail, a marine gastropod mollusk in the family Newtoniellidae. It was described by Powell, in 1958.

References

Newtoniellidae
Gastropods described in 1958